Carl C. Johnson is an American retired U.S. Army Air Force and U.S. Army officer, and former Cleveland, Ohio Airport Commissioner and deputy director of the Pittsburgh International Airport.

Johnson was the final Tuskegee Airmen cadet pilot graduate.

Early life
Johnson was born in Bellaire, Ohio, on the border between Ohio and West Virginia near Wheeling, West Virginia.
 
Though he grew up during Jim Crow racial segregation, Johnson attended a racially integrated high school. Johnson attended Ohio State University, where he studied in preparation to become a dentist.

After being discharged from active duty in the US Army Air Force in 1947, Johnson met his future wife, Nancy, when he resumed his studies at Ohio State University.

Military career
In 1945, Johnson was drafted into the US Army. He was officially inducted into the US Army Air Force at Fort Hayes in Columbus, Ohio.

Initially, the USAAF assigned Johnson to bases in Texas and Indiana. In early 1946, the USAAF admitted Johnson and 14 other African American draftees into its Tuskegee Army Air Field aviation cadet program Class SE-45-I. Unaccustomed to rampant Jim Crow segregation common in the deep southern United States, Johnson, armed with a train ticket on the more luxurious Pullman Porter sleeping train car, was placed in a segregated coach seat behind the train’s hot engine, ending his trip to Alabama covered in soot. Johnson was also prohibited from the train’s dining car based on race.

Johnson contracted appendicitis during training, and was unable to graduate with Class SE-45-I on January 29, 1946. Concerned that the USAAF would terminate him from the program with dozens of other aviation cadets, Johnson continued his training after a two-week convalescence and a weekend pass to Atlanta, Georgia. Tuskegee aviation instructors had notified the commanding general that Johnson would be the program’s very last cadet. In October 1946, Johnson graduated from Tuskegee’s Class 46-C Twin Engine Section as the final aviation cadet, receiving his wings as a flight officer.
 
After Johnson’s graduation, he was assigned to Enid Army Air Field in Oklahoma. He was then assigned to Lockbourne AFB in Columbus, Ohio, as a member of the 477th Bombardment Group Composite’s 617th Bomber Squadron. In 1947 he was discharged. In 1947 while a student at Ohio State University, Johnson joined the Ohio National Guard as a member of its only African American unit.
 
Johnson later returned to active duty service as a U.S. Army aviator during the Korean War.

During the Vietnam War, Johnson commanded a seven-company aviation battalion. He served as commander of a US Army Aviation Battalion in the Republic of South Korea. Johnson retired from the US Air Force with the rank of colonel after 31 years in the U.S. military.

Post-military
After his retirement from the military, Johnson served at the Federal Aviation Administration and the US Department of Defense.

He is former Cleveland, Ohio, airport commissioner and deputy director of the Pittsburgh International Airport.
 
Johnson resides in the Potomac Green community of Ashburn, Virginia.

Awards and commendations
 Distinguished Flying Cross, Vietnam
 Ten (10) Air Medals

Honors
 In 2007, Johnson and the collective Tuskegee Airmen received the Congressional Gold Medal.
 On May 1, 2021, the town of Ashburn, Virginia, the Loudoun County, Virginia Sheriff’s Office and several veterans organizations honored Johnson with a parade in celebration of his 95th birthday.   
 On August 14, 2021, Johnson was the only Documented Original Tuskegee Airman to attend the Tuskegee Airmen Association’s induction of US Air Force Chief of Staff General Charles Q. Brown as an honorary member. 
 On May 29, 2021,  the American Legion Post 2001 honored the ailing Johnson with a battery powered wheelchair.

See also
 Executive Order 9981
 List of Tuskegee Airmen
 Military history of African Americans
 The Tuskegee Airmen (movie)

References

1926 births
Living people
United States Air Force colonels
Military personnel from Ohio
Tuskegee Airmen
United States Army Air Forces officers
Recipients of the Air Medal
Recipients of the Distinguished Flying Cross (United States)
African-American aviators
Congressional Gold Medal recipients
World War II pilots
Tuskegee University alumni
American Vietnam War pilots
United States Army personnel of the Vietnam War
Korean War pilots
United States Army personnel of the Korean War
21st-century African-American people
People from Ashburn, Virginia